Rye is a surname. Notable people with the surname include:
Angela Rye, born 1971, Political commentator
Barbara Lynette Rye, born 1952, Australian botanist 
Daphne Rye (1916–1992), English theatre actress and director
Maria Rye (1829–1903), English social reformer
Michael Rye (born 1918), American voice actor
Olaf Rye (1791–1849), Dano-Norwegian military officer
Roger Rye, MP for Kent
Stellan Rye (1880–1914), Danish-born film director
Thomas Clark Rye (1863–1953), American politician